Talovka is a rural locality (a selo) and the administrative center of Talovskoye Rural Settlement, Kamyshinsky District, Volgograd Oblast, Russia. The population was 1,395 as of 2010. There are 17 streets.

Geography 
Talovka is located in steppe, on the Volga Upland, 40 km southwest of Kamyshin (the district's administrative centre) by road. Gosselekstantsiya is the nearest rural locality.

References 

Rural localities in Kamyshinsky District